Troy University at Phenix City is a satellite campus of Troy University and is located in Phenix City, Alabama, United States.

Academics

Schools/Colleges
The university is composed of five colleges, a graduate school, and a division of general studies:
 College of Arts & Sciences
 College of Communications & Fine Arts
 College of Education
 College of Health & Human Services
 The Sorrell College of Business
 The Graduate School
 The Division of General Studies

Rankings and Reputation
Troy University has acquired different institutional rankings from various sources:
 In 2017, Forbes ranked Troy as the 640th best school in the nation. Forbes' overall ranking centers on the value of the degree obtained by a university's students and measures, in part, the marketplace success of a school's graduate.
 U.S. News & World Report in several categories for 2018:

References

External links

 Troy University Phenix City campus

Education in Russell County, Alabama
Educational institutions established in 1975
1975 establishments in Alabama
Satellite campuses